Dhṛtarāṣṭra (Sanskrit; Pali: Dhataraṭṭha) is a major deity in Buddhism and one of the Four Heavenly Kings. His name means "Upholder of the Nation."

Names

The name Dhṛtarāṣṭra is a Sanskrit compound of the words dhṛta (possessing; bearing) and rāṣṭra (kingdom; territory). Other names include:
Traditional Chinese: 持國天; Simplified Chinese: 持国天; pinyin: Chíguó Tiān;  Japanese: Jikokuten; Korean: 지국천 Jiguk cheon; Vietnamese: Trì Quốc Thiên, a calque of Sanskrit Dhṛtarāṣṭra
Traditional Chinese: 提頭頼吒; Simplified Chinese: 提头赖吒; pinyin: Títóulàizhā; Japanese: Daizurata; Korean: 제두뢰타; Tagalog: Dhltalastla; Vietnamese:  Đề-đầu-lại-tra. This is a transliteration of the original Sanskrit name.
Tibetan: ཡུལ་འཁོར་སྲུང, Wylie: yul 'khor srung, THL Yulkhor Sung, "Defender of the Area"
 Thao Thatarot is an honorific plus the modern pronunciation of Pali Dhataraṭṭha.

Characteristics
Dhṛtarāṣṭra is the guardian of the eastern direction. He lives on the eastern part of Sumeru. He is leader of the gandharvas and piśācas. 

Most East Asian depictions of Dhṛtarāṣṭra show him playing a stringed instrument, but the presence of this motif varies.

Theravāda
In the Pāli Canon of Theravāda Buddhism, Dhṛtarāṣṭra is called Dhataraṭṭha. Dhataraṭṭha is one of the Cātummahārājāno, or "Four Great Kings." each of whom rules over a specific direction.

He has many sons who go by the title "Indra, as well as a daughter named Sirī.

China 
In China, Dhṛtarāṣṭra is considered to be a god of music. In Chinese Buddhist iconography, he holds a pipa in his hands, indicating his desire to use music to convert sentient beings to Buddhism. He is also regarded as one of the Twenty Devas (二十諸天 Èrshí Zhūtiān) or the Twenty-Four Devas (二十四諸天 Èrshísì zhūtiān), a group of Buddhist dharmapalas who manifest to protect the Dharma. In Chinese temples, he is often enshrined within the Hall of the Heavenly Kings (天王殿) with the other three Heavenly Kings. His name Chíguó Tiān (持國天 lit. "King who holds a country") is a reference to the belief that he can help support a country against enemies.

Japan
In Japan, Jikokuten (持国天) is commonly depicted with a fierce expression. He is clad in armor, often brandishing a sword or trident spear while trampling a jaki.

Nāga King

Although an entirely separate figure, Buddhist literature features a Nāga King also named Dhṛtarāṣṭra. He was the father of Gautama Buddha in a past life when the latter was a bodhisattva named Bhūridatta. His story may be found in the Bhūridatta Jātaka of the Pali Canon. 

He is also mentioned in several Mahāyāna Sutras, including the Mahāmāyūrī Vidyārājñī Sūtra and the Mahāmegha Sūtra.

References

External links

Four Heavenly Kings
Lokapalas
Japanese gods
War gods
Gandharvas
Buddhist gods
Twenty-Four Protective Deities